David Park Barnitz (June 24, 1878 – October 10, 1901) was an American poet best known for his 1901 volume The Book of Jade, a classic of Decadent poetry published anonymously by San Francisco bookseller William Doxey.

Life events
Later that autumn, mid-west newspapers were reporting the sudden death of a 23-year-old Harvard graduate and Orientalist scholar, David Park Barnitz (1878–1901), who was, the obituaries said, the anonymous author of "a volume of poems...which was spoken of as of unusual merit." That book was The Book of Jade—one of the poems from The Book of Jade having been published in the Overland Monthly in March 1901 under a new title, but under Park Barnitz's own name. While the newspapers were saying that Barnitz had died accidentally, of an "enlarged heart", it was soon being whispered that Barnitz had actually killed himself.

A student of Dr. Carl M. Belser, Prof. Charles Lanman, and Prof. William James—"a student so intense in his application", the Lutheran papers wrote, "that Professor James of Harvard pronounced him brilliant"—Park Barnitz earned his A.M. (the equivalent of a PhD) at the age of twenty-one, at which time Barnitz was also admitted to membership of the American Oriental Society, "his name being suggested by Prof. Lanman, and was the youngest person ever admitted." In The Book of Jade, in the poem "Harvard: On His Twenty-First Year", Barnitz caricatured these instructors, writing of how "Professors sit on lofty stools upcurl'd,/Through Yankee noses drooling all day long;/ I find all these things quite ridiculous."

Barnitz, however, became more influential in poetry than Asian studies. He adopted the decadent style favoured by gothic and macabre poets including Thomas Lovell Beddoes, Count Stenbock, James Thomson (B.V.), H. P. Lovecraft, and the German Bonaventura. A classmate of fellow poet Wallace Stevens, Park Barnitz was a visionary who prefigured modernism in his adoption of new paradigms and literary styles as a form of mask. This turn has been seen as matching his intellectual cynicism and misanthropy. The decadents, Barnitz wrote, though they "do not lecture at Harvard", "seem to me the most delightful of contemporary French writers." "All these slaves of the opal," Barnitz goes on, "as one of their obscurest members proclaims them, with their one great man (Verlaine) and their hundred pathetic poets, it is surely a fitting thing to admire. 'How nice of them,' one feels like saying, 'to be so dear!' They have not produced a new art, but they have amused."

In the Spring of 2015, Hippocampus Press published a new and expanded edition of The Book of Jade (ed. David E. Schultz and Michael J. Abolafia), with previously unpublished and un-reprinted writings by Barnitz.

In 2019, the prelude of The Book of Jade was translated to French by French poet Tom Buron and published by L'Angle Mort.

See also
 List of unsolved deaths

References

External links
The Book of Jade The only comprehensive David Park Barnitz site

Book Jade New Critical

1878 births
1901 deaths
1901 suicides
19th-century American poets
19th-century American male writers
American male poets
Decadent literature
Harvard University alumni
Unsolved deaths in the United States